The American Baptist Churches USA (ABCUSA) is a Baptist Christian denomination established in 1907 originally as the Northern Baptist Convention, and from 1950 to 1972 as the American Baptist Convention. It traces its history to the First Baptist Church in America (1638) and the Baptist congregational associations which organized the Triennial Convention in 1814. Headquartered in Valley Forge, Pennsylvania, ABCUSA is usually considered mainline, although varying theological and mission emphases may be found among its congregations, including modernist, charismatic and evangelical orientations.

History

Colonial New England Baptists
American Baptist Churches USA have their origins in the First Baptist Church in Providence, Rhode Island, now the First Baptist Church in America, founded in 1638 by the minister Roger Williams. Regarded by the more dogmatic Puritans of the Massachusetts Bay Colony as a heretic for his religious separatism, Williams was banished into the New England wilderness where he and his followers created the settlement of Providence and later, the colony of Rhode Island. Williams is credited with being the founder of the Baptist movement in America, the founder of the state of Rhode Island, and the first highly visible public leader in America to call for the separation of church and state.

Triennial Convention
Having a congregational polity, early Baptist churches in America operated independently from one another, following an array of Protestant theological paths, but were often unified in their mission to evangelize. In the 18th century, they sometimes created local congregational associations for support, fellowship, and work (such as the founding of Brown University in 1764). The evangelical mission led to the establishment of the national Triennial Convention in 1814, a collaborative effort by local churches to organize, fund, and deploy missionaries. The ABCUSA descends from this Triennial Convention. Through the Triennial Convention structure a number of mission-oriented societies were formed, including the American Baptist Foreign Mission Society (1814), American Baptist Home Mission Society (1832), American Baptist Publication Society (1841), and the American Baptist Education Society (1888).

In 1845, a majority of Baptists in the South withdrew support from the Triennial Convention—largely in response to the decision of its delegates to ban slave holders from becoming ordained missionaries—and formed the Southern Baptist Convention (SBC). The Triennial Convention was loosely structured, and the SBC offered Baptists a more centralized organizational structure for carrying on missionary and benevolent work. In contrast, however, the Triennial Convention afforded local churches a higher degree of local autonomy, a more traditional characteristic of Baptist polity. The majority of churches in the North continued to work through these separate cooperating societies for missions and benevolence. The societies were united under the umbrella of a unified convention in 1907.

Northern Baptist Convention
The Northern Baptist Convention was founded in Washington, D.C., on May 17, 1907. Charles Evans Hughes, then Governor of New York and later Chief Justice of the United States, served the body as its first president. The purpose of the Northern Baptist Convention was to bring about a consistent cooperation among the separate Baptist bodies then existing. It was the first step in bringing together Baptists in the North "with ties to the historic American Baptist mission societies in the nineteenth century." These had contributed to establishing many schools for freedmen in the South after the American Civil War, as well as working on issues of health and welfare. Many of their missionaries and members had worked as teachers in the South. In 1911, most of the churches of the Free Will Baptist General Conference merged with it.

Due to the development of theological liberalism in some affiliated seminaries, such as Crozer Theological Seminary, conservative seminaries have been founded by convention pastors, including the Northern Baptist Theological Seminary in Chicago in 1913 and the Eastern Baptist Theological Seminary in Philadelphia in 1925.

American Baptist Convention

The name of the convention was changed in 1950 to the American Baptist Convention (ABC), and it operated under this name until 1972. It was the second step at bringing together on a national level Baptists with ties to the mission societies. The ABC was characterized from 1950–66 with annual resolutions at its conventions having to do with the Civil Rights movement and race relations.

As in many cases, the rhetoric of the annual conventions was sometimes ahead of local activity, but the denomination gradually made progress. In 1964, it created the Baptist Action for Racial Brotherhood (BARB), which early the next year produced a pamphlet outlining actions for change in local churches. In 1968, the national convention was challenged by "Black American Baptist Churchmen Speak To the American Baptist Convention," demands that challenged how the denomination had "conducted its business relative to black American Baptists."

The black churchmen said the convention had excluded them from decision-making positions, even while working with good intentions on behalf of black American Baptists. The following year, Dr. Thomas Kilgore Jr., pastor of the Second Baptist Church of Los Angeles, was elected the first black president of the convention. The 1968 convention also voted to create the Study Commission on Denominational Structure (SCODS). Its recommendations changed the denomination in a variety of ways, after being adopted at the 1972 convention.

American Baptist Churches USA
To reflect its new structure, the convention in 1972 changed its name to the American Baptist Churches USA. Rather than relying on decision-making at the annual Convention by whichever churches happened to send delegates, the SCODS restructuring resulted in the following:

Governance
The American Baptists Churches USA has a congregationalist polity emphasizing local church autonomy. Local churches are organized into 33 regions; the ABCUSA General Board makes policy for the denomination's national agencies. However, board resolutions are not binding on local congregations. Three-fourths of the representatives to the ABCUSA General Board are nominated and elected by the regions. One-fourth of the representatives are nominated by the ABCUSA Nominating Committee and are elected by the regions. The General Secretary of the ABCUSA executes the policies and decisions of the General Board. Rev. Dr. Lee B. Spitzer was called as ABCUSA General Secretary on May 8, 2017.

A substantial portion of the ABCUSA consists of historically and predominantly African American churches that may have joint affiliations with the ABCUSA and historic bodies such as the National Baptist Convention or the Progressive National Baptist Convention. Abyssinian Baptist Church in New York City is one of the many African American churches jointly affiliated with the ABCUSA.

Regions 
The ABCUSA consists of 33 regional associations and conventions:

Statistics
In 2009, the ABCUSA reported 1,310,505 members in 5,402 churches. Membership remained fairly steady during the 20th century. In 1925, there were just over 1.4 million members. Membership peaked in the early 1980s at around 1.6 million. Since the beginning of the 21st century, membership began to decline and stagnate again, with the ABCUSA reporting 1,145,647 members in 5,057 churches at the end of 2017. According to a denomination census released in 2020, it claimed 5,025 churches and 1,126,527 members. According to the official website for the ABCUSA—in 2022 the denomination experiencing an increase—the members and the churches were approximately, 1,300,000 with 5,000 churches.

The majority of its congregations are concentrated in the Midwest and Northeast United States. Numbers of the most wealthy and affluent American families, such as Rockefeller family, are American Baptists.

According to a study by the Pew Research Center in 2014, 21% of its members were aged 18-29; 28% 30-49; 32% aged 50-64 and 19% aged 65 and older. While 51% of its membership were Baby Boomers, the Silent Generation, and the Greatest Generation, the remainder were Generation X, older millennials, and younger millennials, making it slightly younger than the National Baptist Convention and Southern Baptist Convention. Approximately 40% of its membership were men and 60% were women, and the ABCUSA's churches were 73% non-Hispanic white, 10% Black or African American, 1% Asian, 11% Hispanic or Latino American, and 5% multiracial or other.

Theologically, the Pew Research Center's 2014 study determined 83% of the ABCUSA believes in God with absolute certainty, and 15% believed fairly certainly; 73% believed religion was very important and 24% considered it somewhat important. About 42% of members attended churches at least once a week, while 41% attended once or twice a month; 16% seldom or never attend church. An estimated 69% prayed daily, and 19% prayed weekly. Among its membership, 48% read Scripture at least once a week, and 15% once or twice a month; 53% believe the Bible should be taken literally, while 27% believe it is still the Word of God, yet shouldn't be taken completely literally.

Doctrine
American Baptists share the same theological beliefs with Protestant churches which believe that the Bible is the inspired word of God and the final authority in matters of faith. The ABCUSA affirms the Trinity, that the one God exists as three persons in complete unity: God the Father, God the Son, and God the Holy Spirit. They confess Jesus Christ as Savior and Lord through whom those who believe can have fellowship with God. He died, taking on the sins of the world, and was resurrected, triumphing over sin and death.

ABCUSA churches recognize two ordinances: Believer's baptism and the Lord's Supper. Baptism is by immersion, and those being baptized must be of an age to understand its significance. Believing in the priesthood of all believers, the ABCUSA avoids using creeds, affirming the freedom of individual Christians and local churches to interpret scripture as the Holy Spirit leads them. The ABCUSA affirms the ordination of women.

LGBTQ and same-sex marriages 
LGBTQ issues have been a point of contention in the ABCUSA since the 1987 Biennial Meeting. In 1992, the ABCUSA General Board adopted a resolution that stated, “We affirm that the practice of homosexuality is incompatible with Christian teaching.” 

Since 1995, regional conventions of the Convention have carried out excommunications of various churches which have become members of the Association of Welcoming and Affirming Baptists founded in 1993, an association favorable to inclusion LGBTQ people, a belief contrary to a resolution adopted by the denomination.

So far, at least seven regions in the ABCUSA—Evergreen, Wisconsin, Rochester-Genesee, Metro Chicago, Metropolitan New York, Massachusetts, and Philadelphia—support full inclusion of LGBTQ persons into Baptist life. Many ABCUSA churches have also partnered with the Association of Welcoming and Affirming Baptists, which formed at the 1993 Biennial Meeting.

However, several other ABCUSA regions and churches have opposed affirmation of homosexuality, bisexuality, and transgender identity. In 2004, the ABC Central Region reaffirmed the 1992 resolution. At its 2005 annual meeting, the West Virginia Baptist Convention, which had a history of proposing resolutions opposing liberal views on LGBTQ inclusion, narrowly rejected a proposal to withdraw from the ABCUSA over its refusal to discipline those regions that have supported LGBTQ-friendly policies. The Indiana-Kentucky region has also proposed a change in the denomination’s bylaws that would prohibit the transfer of churches into another region if removed from the region because of the issue of homosexuality. 

In 2006, American Baptist Churches of the Pacific Southwest split from the convention due to the convention's laxity with churches on enforcing a 1992 resolution that opposes the inclusion of LGBTQ people and have been renamed Transformation Ministries. The convention responded that it wanted to respect the autonomy of local churches and that it did not want to carry out excommunications. 

Each local congregation is autonomous and permitted to perform same-sex marriages if they opt to do so. For example, Calvary Baptist Church (Washington, D.C.), affiliated with the ABCUSA, performs same-sex marriages. In 2013, an ABCUSA congregation in Washington, DC, ordained the denomination's first openly transgender pastor.

The ABCUSA has consistently allowed each congregation to determine whether or not to perform same-sex marriages, or ordain LGBT clergy. The ABCUSA General Board voted in 2005 to amend the declaration We are American Baptists to define marriage as "between one man and one woman" and maintain that "the practice of homosexuality is incompatible with Biblical teaching." However, the denomination has never officially adopted the board's statement, and has also stated "We respect and will continue to respect congregational freedom on this issue".

Schools 

The ABCUSA has 16 affiliated universities and colleges affiliated with it, and a number of home and foreign missionary societies such as the American Baptist Home Mission Society and International Ministries. Among its universities and colleges, some are also dually-affiliated with the National Baptists—a predominantly African American or Black Baptist denomination founded by freedmen and slaves. Additionally, there are 10 seminaries affiliated with the American Baptist Churches USA:
 Andover Newton Theological School, Newton, Massachusetts, part of Yale Divinity from 2018
 Berkeley School of Theology (formerly called the American Baptist Seminary of the West), Berkeley, California
 Central Baptist Theological Seminary, Shawnee, Kansas
 Colgate Rochester Crozer Divinity School, Rochester, New York
 Evangelical Seminary of Puerto Rico, San Juan, Puerto Rico
 Morehouse School of Religion, Atlanta, Georgia
 Northern Baptist Theological Seminary, Lisle, Illinois
 Palmer Theological Seminary, Wayne, Pennsylvania
 Shaw University Divinity School, Raleigh, North Carolina
 Samuel DeWitt Proctor School of Theology, Virginia Union University, Richmond, Virginia

Notable members 
Includes Northern Baptists (1907–1950) and American Baptists (1950–present)
 Wayland Hoyt (1838–1910), minister and author
 John D. Rockefeller (1839–1937), oil magnate and philanthropist
 Walter Rauschenbusch (1861-1918), theologian and pastor, key figure of the Social Gospel and single tax movements
 Charles Evans Hughes (1862–1948), 36th Governor of New York, 11th Chief Justice of the United States, and first president of the Northern Baptist Convention
 John D. Rockefeller Jr. (1874–1960), financier and philanthropist
 Tony Campolo (b. 1935) American sociologist, pastor, author
 Kamala Harris (b. 1964), Vice President of the United States

See also
 Born again
 Baptist beliefs
 Worship service (evangelicalism)
 Believers' Church
 Christianity in the United States

References

External links

 
 American Baptist Historical Society
Jessie M. Bright Collection at Stuart A. Rose Manuscript, Archives, & Rare Book Library, Emory University

 
Baptist denominations in the United States
Members of the World Council of Churches
Christian organizations established in 1907
Baptist denominations established in the 20th century
Members of the National Council of Churches
1907 establishments in the United States